Late Night Joy is an American late-night talk show hosted by comedian Joy Behar, which premiered on TLC on November 4, 2015. The half-hour weekly series is filmed in Behar's apartment in New York City, where she invites real-life friends for a drink and a conversation about things that "can only be said behind closed doors."

Episodes

References

External links
 
 

2010s American late-night television series
2015 American television series debuts
2015 American television series endings
English-language television shows
Television shows set in New York City
TLC (TV network) original programming